Radio Caroline Volume 1 is the second DJ mix album by Miss Kittin.

Critical reception

Joshua Glazer of AllMusic said, "Hervé proves that she is a wicked DJ," and that "Radio Caroline is a far more esoteric and complicated musical place than the sleek electro-trash ghetto where Miss Kittin is usually placed."

Track listing

Charts

References

2002 compilation albums
DJ mix albums
Miss Kittin albums